Prince Edward is an area between Tong Mi and Mong Kok surrounding Prince Edward station in Kowloon, Hong Kong. Named after Prince Edward Road West, the Prince Edward station of the MTR rapid transit system is an interchange station on the Tsuen Wan and the Kwun Tong lines.

Location
Prince Edward is located between southern part of Tong Mi and the northern part of Mong Kok on either side of Nathan Road, administratively under the Yau Tsim Mong District (until the mid-1990s part of the Mong Kok District). Prince Edward contains the northern end of Nathan Road. Prince Edward is shown on Google Maps as bounded by:

 Boundary Street to the North
 Waterloo Road to the East
 Prince Edward Road West, Sai Yee Street and Bute Street to the South
 Canton Road and Lai Chi Kok Road to the West

Transport
The area is served by the Prince Edward Station of the MTR rapid transit system on both the Tsuen Wan line and the Kwun Tong line. Access to Mong Kok East station includes an entrance via the MOKO shopping centre on Prince Edward Road West.

Policing
Mong Kok Police Station is on Prince Edward Road West. The police station is adjacent to Prince Edward MTR station exit B1.

Sport and recreation
Mong Kok Stadium is a sports venue with capacity of 6,769. It hosts Hong Kong Premier League football matches, with Southern and Kitchee currently ground-sharing the venue as their home ground. The stadium is run by the Leisure and Cultural Services Department of Hong Kong.

Markets
Although Prince Edward area is perceived as part of Mong Kok the following markets are closer to the Prince Edward station:
 Flower Market Road
 Goldfish Street or Goldfish Market — Centered around the section of Tung Choi Street
 Yuen Po Street Bird Garden
 Ladies' Street (Ladies' market on Tung Choi Street)

See also

 List of buildings, sites and areas in Hong Kong
 2019 Prince Edward station attack

References

Areas of Hong Kong
Mong Kok
Yau Tsim Mong District